Aksay is the name of several inhabited localities in Russia.

Modern localities
Urban localities
Aksay, Rostov Oblast, a town in Aksaysky District of Rostov Oblast

Rural localities
Aksay, Republic of Dagestan, a selo in Khasavyurtovsky District of the Republic of Dagestan; 
Aksay, Lipetsk Oblast, a selo in Oktyabrsky Selsoviet of Usmansky District in Lipetsk Oblast; 
Aksay, Republic of Tatarstan, a settlement in Bugulminsky District of the Republic of Tatarstan
Aksay, Volgograd Oblast, a selo in Aksaysky Selsoviet of Oktyabrsky District in Volgograd Oblast

Alternative names
Aksay, alternative name of Novogagatli, a selo in Khasavyurtovsky District of the Republic of Dagestan;